Greenbrier is an unincorporated community in Hart Township, Warrick County, in the U.S. state of Indiana.

History
On April 26, 2011, strong winds – probably a tornado – associated with the 2011 Super Outbreak hit Greenbrier, along Highway 61, uprooting trees, snapping power poles, and causing damages to structures.

Geography

References

Unincorporated communities in Warrick County, Indiana
Unincorporated communities in Indiana